Voter registration in the United States is required for voting in federal, state and local elections in the United States. The only exception is North Dakota, although cities in North Dakota may register voters for city elections. Voter registration takes place at the county level in many states and at the municipal level in several states. Most states set cutoff dates for voter registration and to update details, ranging from 2 to 4 weeks before an election; while a third of states have Election Day or "same-day" voter registration which enables eligible citizens to register or update their registration when they vote before or on election day.

It has been argued that some registration requirements deter some people (especially disadvantaged people) from registering and therefore exercising their right to vote, resulting in a lower voter turnout. Several consequences of registering for voting are mentioned sometimes as deterrents for registration, like to serve jury duty, to be drafted into the military, or to update car insurance in case of changing address of residence, for example. But many of these claims are false or, like being listed as potential juror, are only applicable to certain jurisdictions or are not the only way to be called in to serve.

According to a 2012 study, 24% of the voting-eligible population in the United States are not registered to vote, equaling some 51 million U.S. citizens. While voters traditionally had to register at government offices by a certain period of time before an election, in the mid-1990s, the federal government made efforts to facilitate registering, in an attempt to increase turnout. The National Voter Registration Act of 1993 (the "Motor Voter" law) now requires state governments to either provide uniform opt-in registration services through drivers' license registration centers, disability centers, schools, libraries, and mail-in registration, or to allow Election Day voter registration, where voters can register at polling places immediately prior to voting. In 2016, Oregon became the first state to make voter registration fully automatic (opt-out) when issuing driver licenses and ID cards, since followed by 15 more states and the District of Columbia. Political parties and other organizations sometimes hold "voter registration drives", that is, events to register new voters.

In 31 states and the District of Columbia, persons registering to vote may at the same time declare an affiliation with a political party.

History
In 1800, Massachusetts was the first state to require voter registration as a prerequisite for voting statewide, which was followed by Maine (1821), Pennsylvania (1836) and Connecticut (1839). During the 19th century, and especially after the Civil War, more states and cities would establish voter registration as a prerequisite to voting, partially to prevent voting by immigrants in cities. However, it was not until 1913 when Nebraska became the first state to establish a permanent statewide voter register, overseen by an election commissioner.

According to a 2020 study, voter registration laws adopted in the period 1880–1916 reduced turnout as much as 19 percentage points.

North Dakota abolished voter registration in 1951 for state and federal elections, the only state to do so. It has since 2004 required voters to produce ID at time of casting a vote. This has led to North Dakota being accused of voter suppression because many Native American were denied a vote because the address on their tribal IDs had a post office box address, which continues to be a common practice.

In 2002, Arizona made online voter registration available. In 2016, Oregon became the first state to implement a fully automatic (opt-out) voter registration system tied to the process of issuing driver licenses and ID cards.

No registration jurisdiction 
North Dakota is the only state that does not have voter registration, which was abolished in 1951, although cities in North Dakota may register voters for city elections. In North Dakota voters must provide identification and proof of entitlement to vote at the polling place before being permitted to vote.

North Dakota is exempt from the requirements of the federal National Voter Registration Act of 1993. Because of this exemption, North Dakota has since 2004 required voters to produce an approved form of ID before being able to vote, one of which was a tribe ID commonly used by Native Americans. It was common and lawful for a post office box to be used on this ID, instead of a residential address, because there are no street addresses on reservations. In 2016, a change required tribal ID to have a residential address to be accepted, and North Dakota has been accused of voter suppression with many Native Americans being denied a vote because they did not have an approved form of ID with a residential address.

North Dakota's ID law especially adversely affected large numbers of Native Americans, with almost a quarter of Native Americans in the state, otherwise eligible to vote, being denied a vote on the basis that they do not have proper ID; compared to 12% of non-Indians. A judge overturned the ID law in July 2016, also saying: "The undisputed evidence before the Court reveals that voter fraud in North Dakota has been virtually non-existent." However, the denial of a vote on this basis was also an issue in the 2018 mid-term election.

Federal jurisdiction
While the United States Congress has jurisdiction over laws applying to federal elections, it has deferred most aspects of election law to the states. The United States Constitution prohibits states from restricting voting rights in ways that infringe on a person's right to equal protection under the law (14th Amendment), on the basis of race (15th Amendment), on the basis of sex (19th Amendment), on the basis of having failed to pay a poll tax or any tax (24th Amendment), or on the basis of age for persons age 18 and older (26th Amendment). The administration of elections, however, vary widely across jurisdictions.

In general, US citizens over the age of 18 have the right to vote in federal elections. In a few cases, permanent residents ("green card" holders) have registered to vote and have cast ballots without realizing that doing so was illegal. Non-citizens convicted in criminal court of having made a false claim of citizenship for the purpose of registering to vote in a federal election can be fined and imprisoned for up to a year. Deportation and removal proceedings have resulted from several such cases. Some municipalities allow non-citizen residents to vote in municipal or school district elections.

All states except Maine and Vermont (and the District of Columbia) deny the vote to convicted felons for some duration, a practice known as felony disenfranchisement. In 16 states, voting is only prohibited during incarceration. 21 states additionally prohibit voting during parole or probation but allow voting after. Eleven states either indefinitely suspend voting rights or require special action to have voting rights restored.

Effect on participation

A 2012 study by The Pew Charitable Trusts estimates that 24% of the voting-eligible population in the United States are not registered to vote, a percentage that represents "at least 51 million eligible U.S. citizens." The study suggests that registration requirements contribute to discouraging people from exercising their right to vote, thereby causing a lower voter turnout. The extent of discouragement and its effect on increasing the socioeconomic bias of the electorate however remain contested.

In a 1980 landmark study, Raymond E. Wolfinger and Steven J. Rosenstone came to the conclusion that less restrictive registration requirements would substantially increase the electoral turnout. According to their probit analysis, if all states adopted the procedures of the most permissive state regulations, which would mean:
 eliminating the closing date
 opening registration offices during the forty-hour work week
 opening registration offices in the evening or on Saturday
 permitting absentee registration for the sick, disabled and absent
(p 73) turnout in the 1972 presidential election would have been 9.1% higher, with 12.2 million additional people having voted. In a seminal 1988 book, sociologists Richard Cloward and Francis Fox Piven argued that lowering registration requirements would improve socioeconomic equality in the composition of the electorate.

Findings such as this have inspired lawmakers to facilitate the registration process, eventually leading to the National Voter Registration Act of 1993 (or "Motor Voter" act) that required states to allow voter registration at various public offices, including drivers' license registration centers, disability centers, schools, libraries, as well as mail-in registration, unless a state adopts Election Day voter registration. The way towards passing this piece of federal legislation was however lengthy and rocky, as these reforms were highly contested. In an expanded 1990 edition of their 1988 book, titled "Why Americans still don't vote: and why politicians want it that way," Cloward and Piven argued that the reforms were expected to encourage less-privileged groups which happen to lean towards the Democratic Party.

While the turnout at federal elections did substantially increase following the electoral reforms, the effect fell short of Wolfinger and Rosenstone's expectations while Cloward's and Piven's hope of improving the demographic representativeness of
the electorate wasn't fulfilled at all. Political scientist Adam Berinsky concluded in a 2005 article that the reforms designed to make voting "easier" in their entirety had an opposite effect, actually increasing the preexisting socioeconomic biases by ensuring "that those citizens who are most engaged with the political world – those with politically relevant resources – continue to participate, whereas those individuals without such resources fall by the wayside." As Berinsky reaffirms in a 2016 piece, the only way to increase turnout while improving representativeness is making more people become interested in politics.

Registration centers
Traditionally, voter registration took place at government offices, but the federal National Voter Registration Act of 1993, which came into effect on January 1, 1995, simplified registration. The Act requires state governments to provide opt-in registration services through drivers' license registration centers, disability centers, schools, libraries, as well as providing for mail-in registration. However, six states are exempt from the streamlined processes under the Act: North Dakota, Idaho, Minnesota, New Hampshire, Wisconsin and Wyoming.

Online Registration

As of August 2020, online voter registration was available in 41 states, the District of Columbia, and Guam, with two additional states (Maine and Oklahoma) phasing in implementation. North Dakota does not have voter registration. Since a federal judicial order in September 2020, Texas allows residents to register to vote online if and when they are renewing their driver's licenses or state identification cards.

Automatic voter registration

As of July 2019, 16 states and the District of Columbia had automatic registration of citizens who interact with state agencies such as the DMV, along with 7 other states that have passed legislation or committed administratively to create automatic registration systems, but not yet implemented it. Those interacting with the state agencies have the option to opt-out of registering.

On January 1, 2016, the Oregon Motor Voter Act implemented automatic voter registration of eligible citizens tied to the process of issuing driver licenses and ID cards, with the person having the right to opt out. By April 2016 three more states – California, West Virginia, and Vermont – adopted the system, and in May 2016 Connecticut announced plans to implement it administratively rather than by legislation. Alaskan voters approved Measure 1 on November 8, 2016, to allow residents to register to vote when applying annually for the state's Permanent Dividend Fund. Voter approval of Measure 1 made Alaska the first state to implement automatic (opt-in) voter registration via ballot initiative. New York passed automatic voter registration on December 22, 2020, with implementation to commence in 2023. Several more states have considered legislation for automatic registration. On August 28, 2017, Illinois set July 1, 2018, for implementation of automatic voter registration at motor vehicle agencies, and a year later at other state agencies.

Voter re-registration 
In many jurisdictions in the United States, registered voter must re-register to vote upon changing residential addresses (even within the same county), or changing names. In the 31 states (and District of Columbia) where voters register by political party, a voter desiring to switch party affiliation must also re-register to vote in closed primaries.

Some jurisdictions have automatic voter re-registration whereby existing registrants are automatically re-registered after changing home addresses. A 2022 study found that automatic voter re-registration would increase voter turnout in the US by 5.8 percentage points.

Partial Automatic 
This type does transfer some data from DMV electronically to election officials. For instance, name, age and address. However, does not fully meet the definition of an fully automated system, because it is still relying on paper forms in some way.

Election Day / same-day

The majority of states require voters to register two to four weeks before an election, with cutoff dates varying from 30 to 15 days.

Some states allow Election Day voter registration (also known as EDR) which enables eligible citizens to register to vote or update their registration when they arrive to vote. Some states call the procedure same-day registration (SDR) because voters can register and vote during the early voting period before Election Day.

EDR allows eligible citizens to register or update their registration at the polls or their local election office by showing valid identification to a poll worker or election official, who checks the identification, consults the registration list and, if they are not registered or the registration is out of date, registers them on the spot.

As of March 27, 2018, 17 states and the District of Columbia offer same day voter registration, which allows any qualified resident of the state to go to register to vote and cast a ballot all in that day. Additionally, 1 state (Washington) has enacted same day vote registration, which has yet to be implemented. Also, 9 states have voter registration possible for a portion of their early voting periods.

Five states are exempt from the National Voter Registration Act of 1993 because they have continuously since 1993 had EDR: Idaho, Minnesota, New Hampshire, Wisconsin and Wyoming. Maine lost the exemption when it abolished EDR in 2011, though it was restored later that year. North Dakota is also exempt because it does not have voter registration. In June 2011, Maine abolished EDR, which had been in place since 1973, and abolished absentee voting during the two business days before an election. However, the stipulation banning EDR was overturned in a November 2011 citizen referendum ("people's veto") titled Question 1, when Maine voters reinstated EDR with 59% in favor.

Voter turnout is much higher in states using EDR than in states that do not. A 2013 report analyzing turnout in the 2012 United States presidential election, had SDR states averaging at a turnout of 71%, well above the average voter turn-out rate of 59% for non-SDR states. According to official turnout data report in the 2014 edition of America Goes to the Polls, voter turnout in EDR states has averaged 10–14 percent higher than states that lack that option. Other research suggests that EDR increases turnout between three and fourteen percentage points. A 2004 study summarizes the impact of EDR on voter turnout as "about five percentage points". A 2021 study found that same day voter registration disproportionately increase turnout among young voters; young voters move more frequently, which disproportionately burdens them under traditional voter registration laws.

Permanent & portable registration

As of 2014, Delaware, Hawaii, Oregon, and Texas allow registered voters who have moved within the state to update their registrations when they vote, and are given a regular ballot when they vote. Florida briefly allowed any registered voter who moved to another county and another voting precinct to vote by provisional ballot, except if "the precinct to which you have moved has an electronic poll book or you are an active military member", in which case the voter was given a regular ballot when they voted. As of 2014, the District of Columbia, Maryland, Ohio, and Utah allow registered voters who have moved within the state or the District of Columbia to vote in their new county without re-registering at their new address, but they can only vote a provisional ballot, which could require further action from the voter before it is counted.

Preregistration

Preregistration allows individuals younger than 18 years of age to register to vote, but not to actually vote until they reach 18. All states have some form of preregistration, starting at age 16, except for North Dakota which does not have any registration.

Registration Drives

A voter registration drive is an effort undertaken by a government authority, political party or other entity to register to vote persons otherwise entitled to vote. In many jurisdictions, the functions of electoral authorities includes endeavours to get as many people to register to vote as possible. In most jurisdictions, registration is a prerequisite to a person being able to vote at an election.

In the United States, such drives are often undertaken by a political campaign, political party, or other outside groups (partisan and non-partisan), that seeks to register persons who are eligible to vote but are not registered. In all U.S. states except North Dakota, registration is a prerequisite to a person being able to vote at federal, state or local elections, as well as to serve on juries and perform other civil duties. Sometimes these drives are undertaken for partisan purposes, and target specific demographic groups considered to be likely to vote for one candidate or other; on the other hand, such drives may be undertaken by non-partisan groups and targeted more generally.

In 2004, the Nu Mu Lambda chapter of Alpha Phi Alpha fraternity held a voter registration drive in DeKalb County, Georgia, from which Georgia Secretary of State Cathy Cox (Dem.) rejected all 63 voter registration applications because the fraternity did not obtain specific pre-clearance from the state to conduct their drive.  Nu Mu Lambda filed Charles H. Wesley Education Foundation v. Cathy Cox (Wesley v. Cox) asserting that the Georgia's long-standing policy and practice of rejecting mail-in voter registration applications that were submitted in bundles, by persons other than registrars, deputy registrars, or "authorized persons", violated the requirements of the National Voter Registration Act of 1993 by undermining voter registration drives.  A senior U.S. District Judge upheld earlier federal court decisions in the case, which found that private entities have a right, under the federal law, to engage in organized voter registration activity in Georgia at times and locations of their choosing, without the presence or permission of state or local election officials.

National organizations that regularly work to register voters and promote citizens' engagement in elections include:

Advancement Project
Close Up Foundation
Democrats Abroad
HeadCount
League of Women Voters
Let America Vote
National Association for the Advancement of Colored People
Nonprofit VOTE
Our Time
Rock the Vote
Southern Regional Council
Southwest Voter Registration Education Project
Student Association for Voter Empowerment
The Voter Participation Center
U.S. Vote Foundation
United States Hispanic Chamber of Commerce
Vote.org
Voto Latino

Party affiliation

In 31 states and the District of Columbia, voters are allowed to mark their party affiliation, or their unaffiliated status, on their voter registration form. In those states which host closed primaries for political parties, voters are often mandated to declare their party affiliation prior to receiving a primary ballot, whether on the day of the primary or by a prior deadline. In addition, voters who are party-affiliated in their voter files are most often allowed to participate in intra-party elections and decision-making.

States with party affiliation questions

Deadline to re-register with a party for a primary election

Youth voting 
In some cities, people younger than 18 can vote in local elections, such as for city councils and school boards. Takoma Park, Maryland, was the first city to allow youth voting, starting in 2013. Other nearby cities, including Hyattsville, Greenbelt and Riverdale Park adopted similar measures.

See also
 Voter ID laws in the United States

Further reading

 Alexander Keyssar. 2009. The Right to Vote: The Contested History of Democracy in the United States. Basic Books.
Jimmy Carter Tried to Make It Easier to Vote in 1977. The Right Stopped Him With the Same Arguments It’s Using Today (Excerpt from Reaganland: America's Right Turn 1976-1980 by Rick Perlstein)

References

United States
United States election law
History of voting rights in the United States
Voting in the United States